Dimitshydrus typhlops is a species of beetle in the family Dytiscidae, the only species in the genus Dimitshydrus.

References

Dytiscidae